Beygjeh Khatun (also Romanized as Beygjeh Khātūn; also known as Bech-Khanum, Besh Khanom, Besh Khānum, Beygī Khātūn, Bīgjah Khānūn, Yengejeh Khātūn, and Yengejeh-ye Khātūn) is a village in Sis Rural District, in the Central District of Shabestar County, East Azerbaijan Province, Iran. At the 2006 census, its population was 707, in 193 families.

References 

Populated places in Shabestar County